Yuxarı Seyidəhmədli is a village in the Fuzuli District of Azerbaijan. It was under the occupation of Armenian forces of the self-proclaimed Republic of Artsakh since the First Nagorno-Karabakh war until its recapture by the Azerbaijan Army on or around November 7, 2020.

References

External links 

Populated places in Fuzuli District